KIAA1166 is a human gene.

References

Further reading